Cragus may refer to:

Places
 Mount Cragus, a peak in ancient Lycia
 Mount Cragus (Cilicia), a peak in ancient Cilicia
 Cragus (Lycia), a city near the first Mount Cragus
 Cragus (Cilicia), a city near the second Mount Cragus

Other uses
 Cragus (mythology), in Greek mythology a Lycian god
 Cragus, a synonym for Wulfila, a genus of New World spiders